Woodside High School may refer to:

Woodside High School (Virginia), Newport News, Virginia, United States
Woodside High School (California), Woodside, California, United States
Woodside High School, Wood Green, Wood Green, London, England

See also
 Woodside School (disambiguation)